The Smith Mine Historic District, in Carbon County, Montana, near Bearcreek, Montana, is a historic district which was listed on the National Register of Historic Places in 2009.

It was the site of the Smith Mine disaster in 1943, which killed 75 men, and is among the 50 most deadly mining incidents ever in the United States.

References

External links

Historic American Engineering Record (HAER) documentation, filed under Bear Creek, Red Lodge, Carbon County, MT:

National Register of Historic Places in Carbon County, Montana
Historic districts on the National Register of Historic Places in Montana
Historic American Engineering Record in Montana
Buildings and structures completed in 1906
1906 establishments in Montana
Coal towns
Mining in Montana